General elections were held in Liechtenstein in November 1862. Twelve of the seats in the Landtag were indirectly elected by electors selected by voters.

Electors 
Electors were selected through elections that were held between 3 and 17 November. Each municipality had two electors for every 100 inhabitants.

Results
All 156 electors met on 24 November in Vaduz to elect 12 Landtag members and five substitute members. The Landtag members and their substitutes were elected in three ballots.

References 

Liechtenstein
1862 in Liechtenstein
Elections in Liechtenstein
November 1862 events